Alice Keohavong is a Laotian Australian actress.  She was nominated for the 2013 AACTA Award for Best Actress in a Supporting Role for her role in The Rocket.

Filmography
TV
The 21 Conspiracy (2009) Web series - Helen (2 episodes)
All Saints (2009) TV Series - Mimi (1 episode)
Redfern Now (2013) TV series - Reporter 2 (1 episode)
Plans (2017) Mini series - Claire (3 episodes) 
Pine Gap (2018) TV series - Deb Vora (6 episodes)
Film
Callabona Red (2009) - Cynthia
The Rocket (2013) - Mali

References

External links
 

Australian film actresses
Australian people of Laotian descent
Australian television actresses
Living people
Year of birth missing (living people)